Ouyang Nana (born June 15, 2000) is a Taiwanese singer, musician and actress, known for coming of age romance film Secret Fruit and the cyberpunk action film Bleeding Steel.

Career

Music
Inspired by cellist Mei-Ying Liao, Ouyang Nana started playing the guitar at the age of four, piano at the age of five and cello at the age of six. She won first place in cello and guitar and second place in piano at the Wenhua Taiwan Cup Music Competition in Taiwan. She started attending the music program at Dunhua Elementary School in 2008 and graduated from the school in 2012 with top honors. 

In 2010, she was admitted to study cello at the Affiliated Junior High School of National Taiwan Normal University. The same year, she became the principal cellist of the Century Youth Orchestra. In 2011, she took first place in the Grand Taiwan National Music Competition in both the cello and string quartet categories and first place in the National Music Competition of Taiwan. She has also participated in the National Cello Institute Summer Festival in the U.S. and 2011 Salut Summer Festival in Taitung.

In 2012, Ouyang became the youngest cellist to give a solo recital debut in Concert Hall of Taiwan. The same year, she won the First Award at the Taiwan School Year 100 National Music Competition and was accepted to the junior high music program at National Taiwan Normal University.

In 2013, Ouyang began attending the Curtis Institute of Music in Philadelphia. She then held a series of sold-out concerts in Taiwan and was invited by Orchestra Ensemble Kanazawa in Japan to perform in their concert.

Ouyang left the Curtis Institute of Music in 2015. She then signed with Universal Music Group's Mercury Classics label and released her solo debut album 15, a classical album. 

In 2016, she released her first single, "Warming Your Winter," for her first television drama, Yes! Mr. Fashion, produced by Mandopop producer Jim Lee. 

In 2017, she released her second album, Cello Loves Disney. In December, she performed at the Oscars of science, where she performed a rendition of "See You Again" alongside American rapper Wiz Khalifa. Ouyang became the first Asian person to perform at the event.

Acting
Ouyang first attracted attention with her appearance in the 2014 romance film, Beijing Love Story where she played a cellist. She next starred in the sports film To the Fore, where she was nominated for the Best Supporting Actress at the Macau International Film Festival.

In 2016, she began filming for the science fiction film, Bleeding Steel with Jackie Chan. The same year, she made her small-screen debut in the romance comedy drama Yes! Mr. Fashion opposite Chen Xuedong.

In 2017, she was cast as the female lead in the youth film Secret Fruit, based on the novel of the same name by Rao Xueman. 

In 2018, she was cast as the female lead in the fantasy adventure drama The Great Ruler opposite Roy Wang.

Personal life
Ouyang has ancestors from Ji'an, Jiangxi. She is the daughter of veteran actors Ouyang Long and Fu Juan. She is also the niece of Taiwanese pop singer Ouyang Fei Fei. After she left Curtis, in September 2018, Ouyang resumed her studies at the Berklee College of Music.

Identity controversy
On March 21, 2019, Ouyang said that she is proud of "being Chinese" and will never forget her roots after being censored by Beijing Television. This caused controversy due to the sensitive situation regarding Mainland–Taiwan relations. It is said that it may be due to her father's political stance. She said on Instagram and Weibo that "I am proud of being Chinese." She wrote in a statement: "As an overseas student, [I] often get asked 'where do you come from?' I come from China. This is my answer." She said:" I have a good relationship with both of my parental and maternal grandparents since I was young. I grew up hearing Sichuan dialect, and they said that people should not forget about their roots wherever they go. I am proud of being Chinese. I will remember that my hometown is Ji'an Jiangxi . I will never forget how touched I was when I saw my name on the old Genealogy."

Ouyang's statement on Weibo, on which she has more than 14 million followers, was applauded by her fans in mainland China. The same post, however, sparked debate on Instagram among users from Taiwan and Mainland China, who argued whether Ouyang is Chinese or Taiwanese.
 Her Facebook page sparked anger of some Taiwanese netizens, asking her to 'get out of Taiwan' and 'give up Taiwanese ID, passport and health insurance'.

On March 22, 2019, Ouyang's father responded to the media, saying "from my [cultural and] political background, I support the One-China Policy and 1992 Consensus". He said he was saddened by the mistreatment his daughter had garnered "simply by saying the status quo" and said that the Democratic Progressive Party should take responsibility for Cross-Strait relations.

In March 2021, she announced support for cotton from Xinjiang in mainland China, after some companies had expressed concerns about human rights abuses at the Xinjiang internment camps.

Discography

Albums

Extended plays

Singles

Filmography

Film

Television series

Television shows

Awards and nominations

References

External links

 

2000 births
Actresses from Taipei
Living people
21st-century Taiwanese actresses
Taiwanese child actresses
Taiwanese film actresses
Taiwanese television actresses
Taiwanese musicians
Taiwanese cellists
Musicians from Taipei
Berklee College of Music alumni